Marlene de Andrade (born Zita Marlene de Andrade de Sousa on July 14, 1977) is a Venezuelan actress, model and presenter and wife of Winston Vallenilla.

Biography
Upon graduating from high school, Marlene began studying Pharmacy at the Universidad Central de Venezuela. Her studies were interrupted when she entered into the Miss Venezuela Pageant in 1997. After participating in this event, she formally launched a career as a model and entered one of the modeling agencies in Venezuela. For several months, she worked as a photographic model in several countries such as Colombia, Dominican Republic, United States, Aruba and Japan.

After returning to Venezuela, she attended casting session by RCTV and was cast as a villain in the telenovela Carita Pintada. This was her first acting role. When filming of the telenovela ended, she enrolled in acting classes with Professor Nelson Ortega.

While filming the telenovela Mujer con pantalones in 2005, she met her current husband Winston Vallenilla. In August 2011, their first child, a son named Winston Alexander was born.

In 2008, she was cast as the villain of Leonardo Padrón's telenovela La vida entera.

In 2010, Marlene became an advertising model for Chicas Polar.

Telenovelas

Films
 Una abuela virgen (2007)

References

External links
 

1977 births
Living people
Actresses from Caracas
Venezuelan female models
Venezuelan telenovela actresses